Lattingtown Baptist Church is a historic Baptist church located at Lattingtown, Ulster County, New York.  The meeting house form building was built about 1810 during the Federal period.  It is a two-story, heavy timber-frame structure with queen post and purlin roof framing.  It was extensively renovated during the 19th century to add an eclectic blend of Gothic and picturesque-inspired elements. Also on the property is the church cemetery, with burials dating to 1817; privy; and stone walls.

It was listed on the National Register of Historic Places in 2010.

References

Baptist churches in New York (state)
Churches on the National Register of Historic Places in New York (state)
Churches completed in 1810
19th-century Baptist churches in the United States
Gothic Revival church buildings in New York (state)
Federal architecture in New York (state)
Churches in Ulster County, New York
National Register of Historic Places in Ulster County, New York